Oscar Anthony Henton (born July 27,  1963) is a former American football player who played two seasons in the National Football League (NFL) with the Pittsburgh Steelers.

Early life
Henton was born in Bessemer, Alabama where he later attended Jess Lanier High School.

He  matriculated at Troy State University.

College career
Henton attended Troy State University, Troy, Alabama where he majored in Business Administration. He was chosen Gulf South Conference Freshmen of the Year in 1982 while playing nose guard, before finishing his college career as outside linebacker. Made All-Gulf South Conference Linebacker in 1984. During his four years at Troy he had 87 tackles, 118 assist, 11 sacks and 7 broken passes.

Football  career
Henton was drafted by the Pittsburgh Steelers in the ninth round of the 1986 NFL Draft. During his first season in Pittsburgh Henton was voted as the Steelers Defensive Rookie of the Year and honored with the prestigious "Mean Joe Greene Award". He played two seasons for the Steelers at linebacker. In 1991, Henton was drafted by the Sacramento Surge becoming the first pick in the first round for the World League Of American Football (WLAF). During the 1992 season Henton former college coach, Chan Gailey went into negotiations with the Surge to bring Henton back home to Birmingham where he finished his career as a Professional Football Player.

References

1963 births
Living people
Players of American football from Alabama
American football linebackers
Troy Trojans football players
Pittsburgh Steelers players
Sportspeople from Bessemer, Alabama